Alive III is a live album released by the American hard rock band Kiss in 1993. It is the third installment of the Alive series. The recording of Alive III took place over multiple dates (in Cleveland, Detroit and Indianapolis) during the band's 1992 tour in support of Revenge. It was certified gold in 1994.

Background
Alive III was the first live album the band had released since 1977's Alive II, and the first live recordings released since 1984's Animalize Live Uncensored concert film. The recording of "I Was Made for Lovin' You" was actually recorded at one of the band's soundchecks, but an audience was overdubbed onto the song to make it appear "live", which led to speculation that many other songs on Alive III could be overdubbed, as was done on the first two albums in the series.

The album is the first Kiss live album released during the group's non-makeup era, followed by Kiss Unplugged in 1996. During the recording of Alive II, Kiss did not want to duplicate songs from Alive!, although some songs in Alive III are duplicate songs from their previous live albums, such as "Rock and Roll All Nite". It is also the first Kiss live album to feature a different lineup to the previous two, which featured the original lineup.

The liner notes of Alive III include a family tree showing the various Kiss lineups from 1973–1993, as well as bands that the then-current and former members of Kiss were in. It was designed by the band's Japanese fan club. Tony Iommi of Black Sabbath (for whom Eric Singer drummed in 1986–87) is misnamed Tommy. The notes also mistakenly claim that "Watchin' You" is from Kiss, and "I Was Made for Lovin' You" from Dressed to Kill. The re-release of Alive III (as part of the Kiss Alive! 1975–2000 box set) contains an additional track, "Take It Off", matching the original international CD and US vinyl versions of the album.

Reception

"Canny power-pop gave a merciless headbanging", decided Jeremy Clarke in Q. Kerrang! magazine listed Alive III as eleventh best album of 1993.

Bruce Kulick's climactic version of "The Star-Spangled Banner" was ranked seventh on the Ultimate Classic Rock list "Top 10 National Anthem Guitar Solos", before Ace Frehley's version and after Joe Satriani's.

Alive III was certified Gold by the RIAA on October 27, 1994.

Track listing
All credits adapted from the original release.

"Take It Off" was a bonus track on the Japanese, European and South American CD releases and the US vinyl release. This version of the album would later be included in the Kiss Alive! 1975–2000 CD box set.

Personnel
Kiss
 Paul Stanley – rhythm guitar, vocals
Gene Simmons – bass, vocals
 Bruce Kulick – lead guitar, backing vocals
 Eric Singer – drums, backing vocals

Additional musician
 Derek Sherinian – keyboards

Production
Eddie Kramer – co-producer, mixing
Kiss – co-producers
David Hewitt – engineering consultant
Michael Bernard – post production editing
GGGarth – mixing
Brian Scheuble, Brian Virtue, Mike Douglass, Peter Magdaleno – mixing assistants
Stephen Marcussen – mastering
Margery Greenspan – art direction 
Mitchell Kanner – design

Charts

 Album

 Singles

Certifications

Releases
Mercury 314 514 777-2 (May 18, 1993): CD
Mercury 314 522 647-1 (May 18, 1993): vinyl
Universal Music (2014) B0020470-01: vinyl

References

External links

1993 live albums
Albums produced by Eddie Kramer
Kiss (band) live albums
Sequel albums
Mercury Records live albums